James Chamanga (born 2 February 1980) is a Zambian professional football who plays as a striker for Red Arrows.

Club career
Chamanga's goal against Bafana Bafana earned him his first move abroad as the then South African Premier Soccer League side Bush Bucks signed him in 2005. After Bush Bucks were relegated in 2006 he signed with Supersport United where he was the club's top goalscorer for the 2006–07 season.

Chamanga scored a record-breaking five goals for Swallows in a 6–2 league win against Platinum Stars on 9 December 2007. This included a hat-trick between the 20th and the 24th minute.

In April 2008, Chamanga moved to Chinese Super League club Dalian Shide, after he scored 14 goals in ABSA Premier League for Moroka Swallows in the previous season.

On 6 May 2012, Chamanga made his 100th league appearance for Dalian in a 4–1 home win against Tianjin Teda. He scored a hat-trick in this match.

He scored 14 goals for Liaoning Whowin in 2016 Chinese Super League, tied second on the scorers' ranking table. He renewed his contract with Liaoning Whowin until 2018.

Chamanga suffered serious shoulder injuriy and fractured ribs when challenging for a header during the match against Guizhou Hengfeng on 8 July 2017, but he recovered and decided to stay with team after its relegation to the China League One.

On 6 July 2018, Liaoning Whowin announced that Chamanga would no longer playing for the team, but participate in team management instead, indicating his retirement.

At the end of March 2019, Chamanga came out of retirement and signed a three-month contract with Red Arrows in Zambia.

International career
Chamanga made his international debut on 26 February 2005 against Botswana and five months later he scored his first international goal in the COSAFA Cup semifinal against South Africa.

He was part of the Zambian 2006 African Nations Cup team which finished third in group C in the first round of competition, thus failing to secure qualification for the quarter-finals.
He netted Zambia's opener against Sudan (2008 African Nations Cup) in the Chipolopolo's 3-0 win. Chamanga also scored Zambia's first goal at the 2006 African Nations Cup against Tunisia.

Honours
Zambia
 Africa Cup of Nations: 2012

References

External links 
 
 

Living people
1980 births
People from Luanshya
Association football forwards
Zambian footballers
Zambia international footballers
Zambian expatriate footballers
Africa Cup of Nations-winning players
2006 Africa Cup of Nations players
2008 Africa Cup of Nations players
2010 Africa Cup of Nations players
2012 Africa Cup of Nations players
2013 Africa Cup of Nations players
Chinese Super League players
China League One players
Moroka Swallows F.C. players
SuperSport United F.C. players
Bush Bucks F.C. players
Dalian Shide F.C. players
Liaoning F.C. players
National Assembly F.C. players
Zanaco F.C. players
Zambian expatriate sportspeople in South Africa
Expatriate footballers in China
Zambian expatriate sportspeople in China